In legal terminology, erga omnes rights or obligations are owed toward all. For instance, a property right is an erga omnes entitlement, and therefore enforceable against anybody infringing that right. An erga omnes right (a statutory right) can here be distinguished from a right based on contract, unenforceable except against the contracting party.

Erga omnes is a Latin phrase which means "towards all" or "towards everyone".

International law
In international law, it has been used as a legal term describing obligations owed by states towards the community of states as a whole. An erga omnes obligation exists because of the universal and undeniable interest in the perpetuation of critical rights (and the prevention of their breach).  Consequently, any state has the right to complain of a breach.  Examples of erga omnes norms include piracy and genocide. The concept was recognized in the International Court of Justice's decision in the Barcelona Traction case [(Belgium v Spain) (Second Phase) ICJ Rep 1970 3 at paragraph 33]:… an essential distinction should be drawn between the obligations of a State towards the international community as a whole, and those arising vis-à-vis another State in the field of diplomatic protection. By their very nature, the former are the concern of all States. In view of the importance of the rights involved, all States can be held to have a legal interest in their protection; they are obligations erga omnes. [at 34] Such obligations derive, for example, in contemporary international law, from the outlawing of acts of aggression, and of genocide, as also from the principles and rules concerning the basic rights of the human person, including protection from slavery and racial discrimination. Some of the corresponding rights of protection have entered into the body of general international law ... others are conferred by international instruments of a universal or quasi-universal character.

Examples
 In its advisory opinion of 9 July 2004, the International Court of Justice found "the right of peoples to self-determination" to be a right erga omnes. The finding referred to article 22 of the Covenant of the League of Nations.
 In its judgment of 20 July 2012 between Belgium and Senegal, the International Court of Justice found that in relation to the Convention against Torture "any State party to the Convention may invoke the responsibility of another State party with a view to ascertaining the alleged failure to comply with its obligations erga omnes partes".
 In its order on provisional measures of 23 January 2020, the International Court of Justice found that The Gambia had prima facie standing in the Rohingya genocide case it brought against Myanmar on the basis of the Genocide Convention.

International Law Commission
The UN International Law Commission has codified the erga omnes principle in its draft articles on State responsibility. Article allows all States to invoke a State responsibility that another State incurred because of its unlawful actions if "the obligation breached is owed to the international community as a whole". The ILC refers directly in its comments to this article to the erga omnes principle and the ICJ's acceptance of it in the Barcelona Traction case.

See also
Inter partes
Jus cogens (peremptory norm)

References

Legal doctrines and principles
Latin legal terminology